The Hayes Range is a part of the Alaska Range in Denali and the census area of Southeast Fairbanks, Alaska in the United States. The mountains are located to the east of Denali National Park and are located west of the Delta Mountains, from which they are separated by the Delta River.

The highest point of the range is Mount Hayes, . Other notable summits of the range include Mount Moffit (2nd-highest), Mount Shand (3rd), Moby Dick (4th), Mount Deborah (5th), Hess Mountain (7th), and McGinnis Peak (8th).

References

Alaska Range
Landforms of Southeast Fairbanks Census Area, Alaska
Landforms of Denali Borough, Alaska